Serixiomimus flavus is a species of beetle in the family Cerambycidae, and the only species in the genus Serixiomimus. It was described by Stephan von Breuning in 1966.

References

Desmiphorini
Beetles described in 1966
Monotypic beetle genera